Rössjöholm Castle is a castle in Ängelholm Municipality, Scania, in southern Sweden.

See also
List of castles in Sweden

Castles in Skåne County